"Blue Savannah" is a song by British synth-pop duo Erasure that was issued as a single on 26 February 1990, from their fourth studio album, Wild! (1989). The song was written by members Vince Clarke and Andy Bell. Mute Records released it in Europe as the album's third single, and Sire Records released it in the United States as the album's second single. Considered one of the band's signature songs, the duo still perform it regularly in concerts. It has been described as an uplifting love song; the instrumentation is crisp and heavily synthesized, accented with sweeping, programmed piano.

Release
"Blue Savannah" became one of Erasure's most successful singles, peaking at number three on the UK Singles Chart. It also returned the band to the top 20 in West Germany, where the song peaked at number 13. In Israel, it hit number-one. The release of the single brought about the usual array of remixes and B-sides. 

In 2004, HiBias Records of Canada started their Retro:Active - Rare & Remixed CD series and the 'Out of the Blue' mix received its first official release, on volume one. In 2016, the remix was included on the Erasure 30th-anniversary anthology From Moscow to Mars, making its first-ever official release on an Erasure album. "Blue Savannah" was the inspiration for the song "Escribeme en el Cielo" three years later by the Mexican group Sentidos Opuestos, which is strikingly similar in its instrumental arrangements and melody.

Critical reception
Ned Raggett from AllMusic declared the song as a "strong number", remarking its "relatively low key pulse", "which sounds like a light motorik/Kraftwerk number given the appropriate Erasure sparkle." Bill Coleman from Billboard described it as a "NRG-etic number" and a "lilting, easy-paced gem." Ernest Hardy from Cashbox commented, "Here, Erasure completely shake off their old drag for some Kraftwerk attire, then a Kraftwerk-meets-hip-hop groove thang. It's better than the original." Scottish Dundee Courier complimented the song as "such sterling work".

In an retrospective review, Chris Gerard from Metro Weekly felt that it is "perhaps Erasure's best sounding track – put it on now and its so fresh that is sounds like it could have been recorded yesterday." He described it as "audio daydream; a sublimely beautiful melody, sung with real feeling by Andy Bell, over some of Vince Clarke's loveliest keyboard work. That amazingly vibrant piano part just pops out of the speakers. This is what great pop music is all about – it makes you feel warm just listening to it." Darren Lee from The Quietus noted "the lush electro-splendour" of "Blue Savannah", stating that it is one of "the most gloriously effervescent pop anthems ever recorded." Christopher Smith from Talk About Pop Music called it "joyous" and "Erasure at its very best." He noted that Bell's voice across the first verses and chorus "are both haunting and sensual in equal measure."

Music video
The accompanying music video for "Blue Savannah" was directed by English singer, songwriter, musician and music video director Kevin Godley. It shows Clarke and Bell performing the song in a large, white room, which gets painted blue as the video progresses. A mysterious blue hand is coming down from above. Reaching the room, it holds a paint brush in view. The camera follows the hand as it paints Clarke and a shirtless Bell until they both are completely blue. Eventually gold-colored leaves, similar to those shown on the Wild! album cover, blow in and cover the duo as they perform. 

The video for "Blue Savannah" was later published on Erasure's official YouTube channel in September 2014. It had generated more than 16 million views as of February 2023.

Track listings

 7-inch single (MUTE109) / cassette single (CMUTE109)
 "Blue Savannah"
 "Runaround on the Underground"

 12-inch single (12MUTE109) / CD single (CDMUTE109)
 "Blue Savannah" (Mark Saunders Mix)
 "Runaround on the Underground"
 "No G.D.M."

 Limited 12-inch single 1 (L12MUTE109)
 "Blue Savannah" (Der Deutsche Mix II)
 "No G.D.M." (Unfinished Mix)
 "Runaround on the Underground" (12" Mix)

 Limited 12-inch single 2 (XL12MUTE109)
 "Blue Savannah" (Der Deutsche Mix II)
 "Blue Savannah" (Der Deutsche Mix I)

 Limited CD single (LCDMUTE109)
 "Blue Savannah" (Der Deutsche Mix I)
 "Blue Savannah" (Der Deutsche Mix II)
 "Runaround on the Underground" (12" Mix)

 US CD maxi-single (21428-2)
Note: Also released on 12-inch (Sire 21428-0) and cassette (Sire 21428-4), minus "Blue Savannah" (Single Version).
 "Blue Savannah" (Single Version)
 "Blue Savannah" (Der Deutsche Mix I)
 "Blue Savannah" (Der Deutsche Mix II)
 "Runaround on the Underground" (12" Mix)
 "Blue Savannah" (Mark Saunders Remix)
 "Supernature" (William Orbit's Mix)
 "No G.D.M." (Zeus B. Held Mix)

 US cassette single (Sire 922721-4)
 Blue Savannah (7-inch Edit)
 91 Steps

Charts

Weekly charts

Year-end charts

References

1989 songs
1990 singles
Erasure songs
Music videos directed by Kevin Godley
Mute Records singles
Number-one singles in Israel
Sire Records singles
Song recordings produced by Gareth Jones
Song recordings produced by Mark Saunders
Songs written by Andy Bell (singer)
Songs written by Vince Clarke